Helen Margaret Clarke  (née Shearer, born 16 April 1971) is a former field hockey goalkeeper and captain for New Zealand, who competed in three Summer Olympics: 1992, 2000 and 2004.

Clarke earned a record 166 caps for her country and was appointed a Member of the New Zealand Order of Merit in the 2005 New Year Honours for services to hockey. She was also a member of the New Zealand team at the 1998 Commonwealth Games in Kuala Lumpur, where she won a bronze medal, the 2002 Commonwealth Games in Manchester, and two World Cups. She retired from the sport after the 2004 Olympic Games in Athens. She has taught physical education and English at Mount Roskill Grammar School in Auckland.

References

External links
 

1971 births
Commonwealth Games bronze medallists for New Zealand
Field hockey players at the 1992 Summer Olympics
Field hockey players at the 1998 Commonwealth Games
Field hockey players at the 2000 Summer Olympics
Field hockey players at the 2004 Summer Olympics
Living people
New Zealand female field hockey players
Female field hockey goalkeepers
Members of the New Zealand Order of Merit
Olympic field hockey players of New Zealand
Field hockey players from Auckland
Commonwealth Games medallists in field hockey
Medallists at the 1998 Commonwealth Games